Lori McNeil and Helena Suková won in the final 6–3, 6–7, 6–2 against Rosalyn Fairbank and Gretchen Magers.

Seeds
Champion seeds are indicated in bold text while text in italics indicates the round in which those seeds were eliminated.

 Lori McNeil /  Helena Suková (champions)
 Rosalyn Fairbank /  Gretchen Magers (final)
 Mary-Lou Daniels /  Candy Reynolds (quarterfinals)
 Jo Durie /  Sharon Walsh-Pete (quarterfinals)

Draw

References
 1988 U.S. Women's Hard Court Championships Doubles Draw

Women's Doubles
Doubles
Women's sports in Connecticut